Willow Dell, also known as the Weeden Farm, is a historic farmhouse in South Kingstown, Rhode Island.  It is located on the south side of the highway, just west of Matunuck Beach Road, on a  parcel of land.  The main block of the -story gambrel-roofed house was built c. 1752 by Colonel Jeremiah Bowen, and was purchased in 1826 by Wager Weeden, whose descendants still own the property.  The property includes two barns, a garage, and a stable which has been converted to residential use, as well as the Wager Weeden Memorial Fountain, visible on the south side of the highway by a stone marker.

The house was listed on the National Register of Historic Places in 1996.

See also
National Register of Historic Places listings in Washington County, Rhode Island

References

Houses in South Kingstown, Rhode Island
Houses completed in 1752
Houses on the National Register of Historic Places in Rhode Island
National Register of Historic Places in Washington County, Rhode Island
Colonial architecture in Rhode Island